Cleansing is the fourth album by the American heavy metal band Prong, released on January 25, 1994 by Epic Records. It was produced by Terry Date, whereas Prong's previous two albums had been produced by Mark Dodson. The album features ex-Killing Joke members Paul Raven on bass guitar and John Bechdel on keyboards and programming. Featuring an industrial-influenced sound, the record received moderate commercial success.

The single "Snap Your Fingers, Snap Your Neck" received a commercial interest; its music video received heavy rotation on MTV and was featured on an episode of Beavis and Butt-Head. As a part of the album's promotion, the band toured with Sepultura and Pantera as an opener for their Chaos A.D. and Far Beyond Driven tours, respectively.

The record was reissued by SPV/Steamhammer in 2008.

Background and style
Prong's vocalist and guitarist Tommy Victor has stated that the record was largely written in the bathroom of his Williamsburg apartment on an acoustic guitar at night. Despite the label's opposition, the band chose Terry Date as the producer, recording the tracks at Bad Animals and Magic Shop recording studios. The album was mixed at Electric Lady Studios.

Compared to band's New York hardcore-infused 1980s work, Cleansing incorporates Pantera-influenced guitar grooves and industrial metal sounds; the album's style was also described as alternative metal and industrial rock. According to Victor, the band "really went in the direction of anything that wasn't thrash metal, because we were sick of the whole thing," with The Sisters of Mercy's 1990 album Vision Thing being an influence on the record.

Critical reception

AllMusic critic Stephen Thomas Erlewine described the record as "the band's most varied and best record yet," remarking that the record "tightens up their trademark drilling guitars while adding some slight techno and industrial touches." Erlewine further noted that the new elements "heightens the tension" but also "strengthens their already muscular metallic roar." Record Collectors Joel McIver described the record as "a respectable seller rather than a monster" and wrote: "although the album sounds great to this day, all slablike, noisegated riffs and pulsating beats, it wasn't to be." McIver also compared the staccato guitar sound to the more commercial works of Fear Factory.
 
Jason Roche of The Village Voice included Cleansing on his list of Top 20 New York Hardcore and Metals Albums, saying that it "proved to be as catchy as it was heavy". Tommy Victor has ranked it as the second best Prong album.

Track listing

Personnel
Album credits as adapted from the liner notes.

Prong
Tommy Victor — vocals, guitar
Paul Raven — bass guitar
Ted Parsons — drums
John Bechdel — keyboards, programming

Technical credits
Terry Date — producer, engineer
Prong — producer
Ted Jensen — mastering

Chart positions

Cover versions
"Snap Your Fingers, Snap Your Neck" has been covered by several artists:
Dry Kill Logic on their Rot EP, which was only available from Roadrunner Records metal radio mail list
Demon Hunter on their album, The Triptych
Six Feet Under on their third cover album Graveyard Classics 3
Grinspoon on their EP Pushing Buttons

References

External links
 

Prong (band) albums
1994 albums
Albums produced by Terry Date
Epic Records albums